Chung Wai Keung (born 21 October 1995 in Hong Kong) is a Hong Kong professional football player who plays as a forward for Hong Kong Premier League club Tai Po.

Club career
Chung joined Sun Source when he was 15 years old. In 2015, Chung joined Hong Kong Premier League club Dreams Metro Gallery. On 30 January 2016, Chung scored his first goal in his football career against Hong Kong Pegasus, which the match wins 3:0.

On 12 July 2016, Chung was introduced as a Hong Kong Pegasus player during the club's season opening training session.

On 21 July 2018, Chung moved to fellow HKPL club Tai Po.

On 17 July 2019, Eastern announced the signing of Chung at their season opening media event.

On 9 July 2022, Chung left Eastern.

On 8 August 2022, Chung joined Tai Po.

International career
In 2015, Chung represented Hong Kong U-23 when he was just 19 years old. 

On 11 November 2018, Chung made his debut for the national team and scored an important goal to help Hong Kong defeat Chinese Taipei 2-1. The performance was appreciated by the coaches and fans.

Career statistics

International

International goals
Scores and results list Hong Kong's goal tally first.

Honours

Club
Eastern
 Hong Kong Senior Shield: 2019–20
 Hong Kong FA Cup: 2019–20

Tai Po
 Hong Kong Premier League: 2018–19

References

External links
 Chung Wai Keung at HKFA
 
 

1995 births
Living people
Hong Kong footballers
Hong Kong Premier League players
Metro Gallery FC players
TSW Pegasus FC players
Tai Po FC players
Eastern Sports Club footballers
Association football forwards
Footballers at the 2018 Asian Games
Asian Games competitors for Hong Kong